Jawani is a community in the Mamprusi East District in the North East Region of Ghana. It was formerly in the Northern Region. In 2019, the Chief of the community was Namoorana Salifu Adam.

References 

North East Region, Ghana
Communities in Ghana